Hinode (日の出, 日之出, 日出: "sunrise") may refer to:

Hinode, Tokyo, a town in Japan
Hinode Station, a train station in Japan
Hinode (satellite), a Japan Aerospace Exploration Agency space probe
Eisuke Hinode (日出 英輔, 1941–2012), Japanese politician
Hinode Bridge, a road bridge in Dili, East Timor
Hinode Peak, a coastal peak in Queen Maud Land, Antarctica
Cape Hinode, a rock cape in Queen Maud Land, Antarctica

See also  
Asahi (disambiguation)

 Japanese-language surnames